The men's 5000 metres event at the 1998 World Junior Championships in Athletics was held in Annecy, France, at Parc des Sports on 31 July and 2 August.

Medalists

Results

Final
2 August

Heats
31 July

Heat 1

Heat 2

Participation
According to an unofficial count, 27 athletes from 20 countries participated in the event.

References

5000 metres
Long distance running at the World Athletics U20 Championships